Garfield King (c. 1880-May 25, 1898) was a black man lynched by a mob in Salisbury, Maryland.  He was hung next to the courthouse after he reportedly  shot Herman Kenney, a 22-year-old white man with a revolver after arguing.

Legacy
Shortly after his murder on May 31, a group of local African-Americans convened in the John Wesley Methodist Episcopal Church and drafted a resolution condemning the lynching that was published in The Salisbury Advertiser on June 4, 1898.

His murder and the murders of two other victims of lynching in Salisbury were memorialized by the erection of a plaque next to the old Salisbury courthouse on May 23, 2021 by the Salisbury Lynching Memorial Task Force and the Equal Justice Initiative.

References

1898 deaths
1898 murders in the United States
Lynching deaths in Maryland
Murdered African-American people
People from Salisbury, Maryland